Shams-e Arab Abdollahi (also Romanized as Shams-e ʿArab ʿAbdollahī; also known as Shams-e ʿArab) is a village in Lishtar Rural District, in the Central District of Gachsaran County, Kohgiluyeh and Boyer-Ahmad Province, Iran. At the 2006 census, its population was 58, in 14 families.

References 

Populated places in Gachsaran County